Anthidium falsificum is a species of bee in the family Megachilidae, the leaf-cutter, carder, or mason bees.

Distribution
Chile

References

falsificum
Insects described in 1957
Endemic fauna of Chile